Selectors of All-Pros for the 1959 National Football League season included the Associated Press (AP), United Press International (UPI), New York Daily News (NYDN), Newspaper Enterprise Association (NEA), and The Sporting News (SN).

Offensive selections

Quarterbacks
 Charlie Conerly, New York Giants (AP-2, NEA-2, UPI-2)
 Bobby Layne, Pittsburgh Steelers (AP-2, NEA, UPI)
 Johnny Unitas, Baltimore Colts (AP)

Running Backs
 Jim Brown, Cleveland Browns (AP, NEA, UPI)
 Lenny Moore, Baltimore Colts (AP, NEA, UPI-2,)
 Frank Gifford, New York Giants (AP-1, NEA, UPI)

References

External links
 1959 NFL All-Pros – Pro-Football-Reference

 

All-Pro Teams
1959 National Football League season